Ingleside is a historic home located at 10920 Rodophil Road (SR 620) in Rodophil, an unincorporated community in western Amelia County, Virginia. The main section of the house was built about 1824, and is a -story, single-pile frame building. It has a two-story, single-pile frame addition added about 1840. The house is in a late Federal style. Also on the property are a contributing two-story frame hay barn (c. 1920) sheathed in weatherboard and a -story frame tobacco barn (c. 1910).

It was added to the National Register of Historic Places in 1997.

References

Houses on the National Register of Historic Places in Virginia
Federal architecture in Virginia
Houses completed in 1824
Houses in Amelia County, Virginia
National Register of Historic Places in Amelia County, Virginia